Peter Quinn (1925 – 30 January 2016), also credited as Peter Quinlan (to avoid the ban on clerics playing inter county football), was an Irish Gaelic footballer who played as a wing-back at senior level for the Mayo county team.

Biography
Born near Ballina, County Mayo, Quinn was introduced to Gaelic football during his schooling at St Muredach's College. At club level he first lined out as a minor with Ardnaree before later joining the senior team.

Quinn made his debut on the inter-county scene when he first linked up with the Mayo senior team. He went on to play a key role during a hugely successful era, and won two All-Ireland medals and four Connacht medals. He was an All-Ireland runner-up on one occasion.

Quinn retired from inter-county football following the conclusion of the 1951 championship.

Fr Quinn was a native of Quignashee, Ballina, and was ordained in Dalgan Park, Navan, County Meath, for the Columban Missionaries in 1950. His brother Des was also a Columban Fathers.

Honours
Mayo
All-Ireland Senior Football Championship (2): 1950, 1951
Connacht Senior Football Championship (4): 1948, 1949, 1950, 1951

References

1925 births
2016 deaths
Ardnaree Sarsfields Gaelic footballers
20th-century Irish Roman Catholic priests
Mayo inter-county Gaelic footballers
People from Ballina, County Mayo